Jean-Pierre Paranteau (born 5 August 1944) is a former French cyclist. He competed in the individual road race at the 1968 Summer Olympics.

References

External links
 

1944 births
Living people
French male cyclists
Olympic cyclists of France
Cyclists at the 1968 Summer Olympics
People from Angoulême
Sportspeople from Charente
Cyclists from Nouvelle-Aquitaine